Agrilus bilineatus, the two-lined chestnut borer, is a species of metallic wood-boring beetle in the family Buprestidae. It is native to North America, and has been introduced to Turkey.

References

Further reading

External links

 

bilineatus
Articles created by Qbugbot
Beetles described in 1801